This is a list of presidents of the Himan and Heeb, an autonomous region in Somalia. The President of Himan and Heeb was an executive head of state, also functioning as the head of administration (head of government). There is no prime minister.

The local administration's term is 5 years with the exception of the Council of Elders (Guurti); the Guurti has the power to re-appoint new or retain the old members of the administration. In early October 2010, the Council of Elders (Guurti) in Adado renewed the term of President Mohamed Adan Tiicey and his administration for another five years.

List of officeholders

See also 

 List of presidents of Somalia
 List of presidents of Galmudug
 List of presidents of Hirshabelle
 Lists of office-holders

References

External links 

 World Statesmen – Somalia (Himan and Heeb)

Himan and Heeb
Himan and Heeb presidents
Himan and Heeb